McLeod Glacier may refer to one of two glaciers in Antarctica:

 McLeod Glacier (South Orkney Islands)
 McLeod Glacier (Wilson Hills)